Anicad, Anikkad or Anicadu may refer to:
 Anicad, a village in Kottayam district, Kerala
 Anikkad, a village in Ernakulam district, Kerala
 Anicadu, a village in Pathanamthitta district, Kerala